Hans Galjé (born 21 February 1957) is a Dutch football coach and former professional player. During his playing career, he  played as a goalkeeper for ADO Den Haag, Ajax, FC Utrecht, KV Kortrijk, KSV Waregem and Club Brugge. He was manager of Belgian side R.E. Mouscron in the final months of its existence.

Personal life 
Hans's nephew Timothy is also a footballer.

References

External links

1957 births
Living people
Dutch footballers
Dutch football managers
ADO Den Haag players
AFC Ajax players
FC Utrecht players
K.V. Kortrijk players
Club Brugge KV players
Eredivisie players
Belgian Pro League players
Association football goalkeepers
Royal Excel Mouscron managers
Footballers from Delft
Dutch expatriate football managers